Sebastian Ernst (born 4 March 1995) is a German professional footballer who plays as a midfielder for Hannover 96.

Career
Ernst is a Hannover 96 youth exponent.

In the 2016–17 winter transfer window, Ernst moved to 2. Bundesliga club Würzburger Kickers from 1. FC Magdeburg and made 7 appearances in the second half of the season.

Following Würzburger Kicker's relegation Ernst remained in the 2. Bundesliga signing a three-year contract with SpVgg Greuther Fürth in June 2017. He joined on a free transfer.

Ernst rejoined Hannover 96 ahead of the 2021–22 season.

Career statistics

Club

References

External links
 

1995 births
Living people
Association football midfielders
German footballers
3. Liga players
2. Bundesliga players
Hannover 96 players
1. FC Magdeburg players
Würzburger Kickers players
SpVgg Greuther Fürth players